Open from 18 to 24 is a 1988 Argentine drama film directed and written by Víctor Dínenzon.

The picture stars Gerardo Romano and Horacio Peña, and others.

Plot

From six until midnight, a tango class is led by Carla, who just lost the love of her life, Vincente.

The mostly middle-aged, middle-class students attend the class for a variety of reasons, but for the most part they enjoy the sensual romanticism of the tango's dance movements and music.

When Vincente's handsome nephew shows up from the countryside, passions grow more heated, and closeted jealousies and rivalries of the students become unscaled. At the film's end, the leader Carla reveals a surprising fact about herself.

Cast
Gerardo Romano
Horacio Peña
Bernardo Baras
Néstor Francisco
Zulma Grey
Chris La Valle
Jorge Luz
Jorge Abel Martín
Silvia Peyrou
Aldo Piccione
Omar Pini
Carmen Renard
Nora Sajaroff
Cora Sanchez
Carlos Santamaría
Eduardo Santoro
Néstor Zacco

Exhibition
The film was released  on 2 June 1988.

Footnotes

External links
 Abierto de 18 a 24 at the cinenacional.com 
 

1988 films
1988 drama films
1980s Spanish-language films
Tango films
Argentine drama films
1980s Argentine films